Rüdiger Klein (born March 24, 1958 in Nickenich) is a German neurobiologist. He is director at the Max Planck Institute for Biological Intelligence (formerly Max Planck Institute of Neurobiology) and head of the department Molecules - Signaling - Development.

Rüdiger Klein studied biology at the universities of Marburg and Tübingen and at the Juniata College (USA). He gained his PhD at the University of Tübingen and worked as a post-doctoral researcher at the National Cancer Institute at Frederick (NCI-Frederick) (USA) and at the Bristol-Myers Squibb Pharmaceutical Research Institute (USA). Afterwards, he led a junior research group at the European Molecular Biology Laboratory (EMBL) in Heidelberg. In 2001, he was appointed director at the Max Planck Institute of Neurobiology.

Scientific focus 
Rüdiger Klein’s scientific research is focused on the molecular mechanisms which allow nerve cells to communicate.

Rüdiger Klein’s work led to a number of scientific findings. Among these were 
 the discovery of the receptors (TRK) of certain nerve growth factors. (Klein et al., Cell 1991a,b)
 the proof that certain signalling molecules (ephrins) guide the growth direction of nerve cell axons via repulsion. (Henkemeyer et al., Cell 1996; Orioli et al.,  EMBO Journal 1996; Brückner et al., Science 1997)
 the observation that ephrins regulate not only the development of the nervous system but also that of the lymphatic system and blood vessels. (Adams et al., Genes Dev. 1999; Mäkinen et al. Genes Dev. 2005)

External links 
 Homepage of the department Molecules - Signaling - Development

References 

21st-century German biologists
1958 births
Living people
20th-century German biologists
People from Mayen-Koblenz